Monk's Walk School is a secondary school with academy status located on the outskirts of Welwyn Garden City, Hertfordshire, England. It opened in 1964 and became an Academy in 2012. The school's motto is: "Excellence for All".

The school's annual student intake is approximately 220 eleven- and twelve-year-olds of both sexes, with 1,324 students throughout the school. It also has approximately 185 teachers and staff.

Alumni

 Hannah Botterman, Saracens Women and England women's national rugby union team player
 Paul Buckle
 David Button, West Bromwich Albion Goalkeeper
 Alesha Dixon, musician and TV presenter
 Phil Driver, former Chelsea Winger
 Tom Lewis, golfer
 Corey Panter, footballer at Luton Town on loan at Dundee F.C.
 Jaguar Skills, Mix up mash up DJ
 Lisa Snowdon
 Abubakar Salim, actor and video-game voice actor
 Louise Fiddes, Paralympics silver medalist

References

3.https://www.whtimes.co.uk/news/education/welwyn-garden-city-monks-walk-teacher-banned-from-the-profession-5593072

Secondary schools in Hertfordshire
Schools in Welwyn Garden City
Academies in Hertfordshire